Matthew James Matheson (born February 7, 1982) is a Canadian chef, restaurateur, actor and internet personality. He was the executive chef of Parts & Labour, a restaurant located in Toronto, Ontario, which permanently closed on January 1, 2019. Matheson has since started Matty's Patty's Burger Club, a takeout restaurant in Toronto, Canada, which opened in December 2020. In April 2022, Matheson opened Prime Seafood Palace, which is also located in Toronto. Matheson regularly appeared on Vice's show Munchies. He previously hosted Viceland's It's Suppertime! and Dead Set on Life.

Early life
Matheson was born in Saint John, New Brunswick to engineer Stephen and waitress Joan Matheson. The family lived in Nova Scotia until Matheson turned 11, when they moved to Fort Erie, Ontario. Before moving to Ontario, Matheson had grown up as a member of The Church of Jesus Christ of Latter Day Saints; however, the family left the church when leaving Nova Scotia. Matheson's grandfather was a restaurateur and former RCMP officer from Prince Edward Island, the family having roots in PEI dating back to the 1700s. His grandfather owned and operated The Blue Goose restaurant in DeSable, where Matty would spend his summers.

Matheson moved to Toronto in 2000 and attended Humber's cooking program. Although he dropped out of the program before graduating in order to serve on a short stint on tour as a roadie for his friends' metal band, Matheson found he had a talent for butchering meat, and he continued his culinary career by handing out resumes to random restaurants until he found employment.

Career

Early culinary career
Matheson began working at Le Sélect Bistro in Toronto in 2003 under chef Rang Nguyen, who taught him French culinary techniques. In 2006, Matheson was hired at the restaurant, La Palette.
In 2010, Matheson became executive chef at the new Parts & Labour restaurant until it closed in 2019. His recognition, along with his outgoing and wild personality, would lead to his appearance on the online show Munchies by Vice Media.

On-screen
He was hired to host Viceland's It's Suppertime and Dead Set on Life. Matheson also maintains his own Youtube channel.

Matheson has also appeared on Jimmy Kimmel Live! where he showed Jimmy Kimmel how to make a "stuffed shell family recipe".

In April 2021, Matheson was signed with Endeavor (formerly William Morris/Endeavor). In June 2022, Matheson joined the cast and crew of FX's The Bear as a producer and guest star. He played handyman Neil Fak, and also served as a culinary consultant on the show.

Restaurants
Matheson partnered with Shlomo Buchler in 2015 to create a pizza restaurant called Maker Pizza that has opened and expanded into numerous locations within the Greater Toronto Area.

During the COVID-19 pandemic in the summer of 2020, Matheson created a pop-up restaurant called Matty Matheson's Meat + Three, a take on an American meat and three, specializing in American barbecue, in Fort Erie; the Meat + Three pop-up closed in 2022.

In October 2020, Matheson opened another pop-up restaurant in Toronto, a continuation of Matty's Patty's, originally located in Hawaii with a short stint in Shibuya, Japan. Matty's Patty's opened a permanent location in the Trinity-Bellwoods neighbourhood in Toronto in December 2020.

In April 2021, Matheson partnered with Toronto chefs Kate Chomyshyn and Julio Guajardo to open a new pop-up restaurant in Toronto called Birria Balam, specializing in the Mexican dish birria; the pop-up subsequently closed once Matheson, Chomyshyn, and Guadjardo opened up the new permanent restaurant Fonda Balam in the Trinity-Bellwoods and Little Italy neighbourhoods of Toronto in October 2021, serving birria and other Mexican cuisine.

In January 2022, Matheson teamed up with his mentor and friend Rang Nguyen and opened Ca Phe Rang, a Vietnamese restaurant serving pho and bánh mì, opening in the previous Chinatown, Toronto pop-up location of Birria Balam.

In April 2022, Matheson opened Prime Seafood Palace, a steakhouse and seafood restaurant in Trinity-Bellwoods, Toronto that he had been working on since 2016.

In November 2022, Matheson opened Rizzo's House of Parm, a restaurant serving old-school Italian-American cuisine, at Crystal Beach in Fort Erie, Ontario. He named the restaurant after his first daughter and second child Rizzo and took inspiration from the Italian family of his wife Tricia.

Matheson has incorporated all of his restaurants into his company, Our House Hospitality Company.

Cookbooks
In October 2018, Matheson released his first cookbook, Matty Matheson: A Cookbook.

On September 29, 2020, Matheson released his second cookbook, Matty Matheson: Home Style Cookery. Matty recorded a series of YouTube videos to coincide with the release of this book.

Miscellaneous
In March 2020, Matheson and artist Alex 2Tone, co-founder of streetwear brand Born X Raised, started a podcast, titled Powerful Truth Angels, with producer Jason Nelken.

In 2020, Matheson teamed up with Toronto chef Keenan McVey and opened Blue Goose Farm, a small farm operation in Fort Erie, Ontario; the farm, named after a restaurant owned by Matheson's grandfather, helps supply vegetables to some of his restaurants and other restaurants in Toronto.

In 2022, Matheson started the "hyper-local entrepreneur" workwear clothing line, Rosa Rugosa, with production based in the West Toronto neighbourhood of Parkdale. Matheson has also started a kitchen utensil collection.

Personal life
Matheson married his long-time girlfriend Tricia (Trish) Spencer in 2014. Together, they have three children: son MacArthur (born in 2016), and daughters Rizzo (born in 2018) and Ozzy (born in 2020). He and his family live in Fort Erie, Ontario.

Matheson has had a history of past substance abuse. Matheson first tried cocaine in 11th grade. His regular use of the drug would lead him to a heart attack at the age of 29. After his heart attack, he quit using drugs and alcohol at the end of 2013. Seven months after becoming sober, Matheson shot his first episode of Keep It Canada.

Television

As producer

As writer

Guest Appearances

Bibliography

Non-fiction

References

External links
 

1982 births
Living people
Businesspeople from Saint John, New Brunswick
Businesspeople from Toronto
Canadian restaurateurs
Canadian television chefs
Canadian male chefs
Chefs from Toronto